This is a list of castles and palaces in Sweden.

In the Swedish language the word slott is used for both castles, châteaus and palaces; this article lists all of them as well as fortresses.

A-B

C-E

F-H

I-L

M-P

R-S

T-U

V-Y

å-ö

See also
List of castles

Finnish castles
For historic Swedish castles see also List of castles in Finland.

Danish castles
For historic Danish castles located in southern Sweden see also List of castles in Scania

Sweden
Castles and palaces
Sweden
Castles and palaces